Pavel Cebanu (born 28 March 1955 in Reni, Ukraine) is a former Moldovan football (soccer) player. He spent his entire career, from 1973 to 1985, at the Moldovan side FC Nistru Chişinău. He was captain for many years and played 341 games scoring 45 goals.

He was the president of the Football Association of Moldova, for 22-year from 1 February 1997 to 2019 and was succeeded by Leonid Oleinicenco.

In November 2003, to celebrate UEFA's Jubilee, he was selected as the Golden Player of Moldova by the Football Association of Moldova as their most outstanding player of the past 50 years.

References

External links
 UEFA.com - Moldova's Golden Player
 Profile - Moldova.sports.md

1955 births
Living people
People from Odesa Oblast
Moldovan footballers
Soviet footballers
FC Zimbru Chișinău managers
UEFA Golden Players
Recipients of the Order of Honour (Moldova)
Association football forwards
Moldovan football managers